The Northup Trail is a Louisiana Scenic Byway that follows several different state highways, primarily:
LA 27 and LA 107 from southwest of Bunkie to Marksville; and
US 71 from Bunkie to Alexandria.

References

Louisiana Scenic Byways
Tourist attractions in Avoyelles Parish, Louisiana
Tourist attractions in Rapides Parish, Louisiana
Scenic highways in Louisiana
U.S. Route 71